Joonas Vahtera (born 6 January 1996) is a Finnish football player who plays for VPS.

Club career
He made his Veikkausliiga debut for VPS on 8 April 2016 in a game against HJK.

Vahtera signed for HJK Helsinki on 21 December 2018.

On 31 July 2020, Vahtera joined RoPS on loan for the remainder of the 2020 season.

References

External links
 

1996 births
Sportspeople from Vaasa
Living people
Finnish footballers
Finland under-21 international footballers
Vasa IFK players
Vaasan Palloseura players
Helsingin Jalkapalloklubi players
Kakkonen players
Ykkönen players
Veikkausliiga players
Association football defenders